Kirk Furey (born January 28, 1976 in Glace Bay, Nova Scotia) is a Canadian former professional ice hockey defenceman who is a coach in the youth ranks of EC KAC of the ICE Hockey League.

Playing career
After three years in the Ontario Hockey League (OHL) with the Owen Sound Platers, Furey played a year with the Cape Breton Islander's of the Maritime Junior Hockey League before attending Acadia University where he starred with the Acadia Axemen. In his rookie year at Acadia in 1997–98, the Axemen reached the national final, only to lose to the UNB Varsity Reds. In 2001, Furey with Canada national team won silver medals at the 2001 Winter Universiade in Zakopane, Poland.

Furey turned professional in 2001 and spent the next three seasons dividing his time between the ECHL's Atlantic City Boardwalk Bullies and the American Hockey League's (AHL) Philadelphia Phantoms. In 2003, he helped the Boardwalk Bullies capture the Kelly Cup as ECHL champions. The Bullies defeated the Columbia Inferno in five games in the best-of-seven series. Furey finished tied for second in playoff scoring among defencemen with a goal and 10 assists. His 10 assists were the most by a defenseman.

In 2004, Furey's hockey career took him to Europe. He played for the Kassel Huskies of the Deutsche Eishockey Liga (DEL) in Germany and later the Iserlohn Roosters from 2005 to 2007. He played the last eight years of his career with EC KAC of the Erste Bank Eishockey Liga (EBEL) in Austria, winning the championship in 2009 and 2013. He retired after the 2014–15 season.

Coaching career
After retiring in 2015, Furey remained with EC KAC and was named assistant coach of the team. He joined the coaching staff of the club's youth ranks in April 2016.

Career statistics

References

External links
 

1976 births
Living people
Atlantic City Boardwalk Bullies players
Canadian expatriate ice hockey players in Austria
Canadian expatriate ice hockey players in Germany
Canadian ice hockey coaches
Canadian ice hockey defencemen
EC KAC players
Ice hockey people from Nova Scotia
Iserlohn Roosters players
Kassel Huskies players
Owen Sound Platers players
Philadelphia Phantoms players